European route E 612 is a European B class road in Italy, connecting the cities Ivrea – Turin

Route 
 
 E25 Ivrea
 E70, E64, E717 Turin

External links 
 UN Economic Commission for Europe: Overall Map of E-road Network (2007)
 International E-road network

International E-road network
Roads in Italy